Clube Atlético Mineiro is a Brazilian football club based in Belo Horizonte, Minas Gerais, Brazil. The club was formed in 1908 as Athletico Mineiro Foot Ball Club, and changed its name to the current one in 1913. Atlético Mineiro played its first competitive match on 15 July 1915, when it entered the inaugural Campeonato Mineiro, the state league of Minas Gerais.

Atlético Mineiro's first official trophy was the Campeonato Mineiro in 1915, the inaugural edition of the competition, which the club has won a record 43 times. Atlético's only Campeonato Brasileiro title was won in 1971, and the first Copa do Brasil came in 2014. At international level, Atlético was the most successful club of the Copa CONMEBOL with two wins, and has won the Copa Libertadores and the Recopa Sudamericana once each. The club's most recent trophy is the 2015 Campeonato Mineiro.

The list details the club's year-to-year records in the major competitions it took part in, starting in the 1915 season, year of the first edition of the Campeonato Mineiro.

History 
Atlético Mineiro was formed in 1908 in Belo Horizonte, and first took part in and won an official competition in 1915, the inaugural edition of the Campeonato Mineiro, the state league of Minas Gerais. The club has played in all editions of the Mineiro, winning the competition a record 43 times. From 1915 to 1958, the only regular competition in which the club played was the state league, but the club also took part in and won the 1937 Copa dos Campeões Estaduais, contested by the state league champions from Minas Gerais (Atlético), Rio de Janeiro (Fluminense), São Paulo (Portuguesa) and Espírito Santo (Rio Branco).

From 1959 to 1968, the club appeared in some editions of the Taça Brasil, the first annual nationwide competition in Brazil, contested in cup format between state league champions, created in order to select Brazil's representatives in the Copa Libertadores. From 1967 to 1970, Atlético participated in the Torneio Roberto Gomes Pedrosa, a new national tournament which included more teams than the Taça Brasil, but played during the same season, and from 1971 onwards, it took part in the Campeonato Brasileiro Série A, a national championship that replaced both previous competitions. The club has spent almost every season on the top flight of the Brazilian football league system, the exception being 2006, when it played in the Série B, following relegation in 2005. Atlético won the inaugural Brasileiro in 1971, and finished second on five occasions. In 1989, a new national cup competition was introduced, Copa do Brasil, which Atlético has won once, taking part in all but one of its seasons. Throughout its history, Atlético has also participated in other short-lived national tournaments, such as the Torneio do Povo and the Copa dos Campeões Brasileiros in the 1970s, the Copa Sul-Minas and the Copa Centro-Oeste in the 2000s, and the Brazilian Primeira Liga in the 2010s.

Atlético Mineiro's involvement in official international club football dates back to 1972, when the club qualified for the Copa Libertadores as Brazilian champions in 1971, its first continental participation. In total, the club has participated in 23 continental competition editions, and in one edition of an intercontinental competition, winning four titles and appearing in three more finals as runner-up. Atlético Mineiro won its first continental trophy in 1992, the inaugural Copa CONMEBOL, a competition which it won again in 1997. In 2013 the club won its first Copa Libertadores, a title followed by the 2014 Recopa Sudamericana. The club's first and only appearance in an intercontinental competition happened in the 2013 FIFA Club World Cup, in which it finished in third place.

Key 
Table headers
 P – Number of games played
 W – Number of gameswon
 D – Number of games drawn
 L – Number of games lost
 GF – Number of goals scored
 GA – Number of goals conceded
 Pts = Number of points at the end
 Pos = Final position
League divisions
 Mineiro – Campeonato Mineiro (state)
 Taça Brasil – Taça Brasil (national)
 Robertão – Torneio Roberto Gomes Pedrosa (national)
 Série A – Campeonato Brasileiro Série A (national)
 Série B – Campeonato Brasileiro Série B (national)
 Super Mineiro – Supercampeonato Mineiro (state)Results and rounds
 Group – Group stage
 R1, R2, R3 – First, second, third round
 R16 – Round of 16
 QF – Quarter-finals
 SF – Semi-finals
 RU – Runner-up
 W – Winner

Seasons

Notes

References

Seasons
Atletico Mineiro